Novruz in Azerbaijan is a traditional holiday which celebrates the Persian New Year and the coming of Spring. When Azerbaijan was part of the Soviet Union, the celebration of Novruz was generally unofficial and at times even prohibited. Currently in Azerbaijan, Novruz is treated as an official public holiday. In accordance with Article 105 of the Labour Code of Azerbaijan passed in 2006, workers receive five days off for Novruz. After neighbouring Iran, Azerbaijan hosts the longest observance and number of public days related to Novruz, with a total (including weekend) of 5 days.

Novruz customs and celebration 
Usually, preparation for Novruz begins a
month prior to the festival. Each Tuesday people celebrate the day of one of the four elements – water, fire, wind and soil. People do house cleaning, plant trees, make new dresses, paint eggs, and make national pastries such as shekerbura, pakhlava, shorgoghal, in additional to a great variety of national cuisine. Wheat is fried with kishmish (raisins) and nuts (govurga). As a tribute to pre-Islamic Zoroastrian beliefs, every Tuesday during the four weeks before the holiday, children jump over small bonfires and candles are lit. On the holiday eve, the graves of relatives are visited and tended.

During Novruz, various traditional games and shows such as “Kos-kosa” (symbolizes the coming of spring), “Khidir Ilyas” (the symbol of fertility and blossom) and fortune-telling are held at musical gatherings. Folk singers sing songs while wrestlers test their strength.

Novruz is a family holiday. In the evening before the holiday, the whole family gathers around the holiday table laid with various dishes to make the New Year rich. The holiday goes on for several days and ends with festive public dancing, contests of national sports and other entertainment such as from folk bands.

The decoration of the festive table is known as khoncha. A large silver or copper tray with samani – green shoots from wheat seeds – is placed in the centre and candles and dyed eggs. Custom dictates that the table should be set with at least seven dishes.

Charshanbas 

The last four Tuesdays of winter (usually starts from the last Tuesday of February) before Novruz are celebrated by Azerbaijanis and called as “Charshanba”. According to Azerbaijani traditions, “Charshanbas” indicates the end of winter and start of spring. According to the folk belief, the first Charshanba represents water and celebrates its purifying nature.

The second Charshanba relates to the element of fire. It is believed that the action of jumping over bonfires and lighting candles renews a person and purges them of illness, allowing them to start the spring with positivity.

The third Charshanba in Azerbaijani tradition represents wind, which brings the beginning of spring on the air. In some western regions of Azerbaijan, the people call this day as Black Wednesday. Azerbaijanis are supposed to visit and restore the graves of their relatives

The fourth and last Charshanba represents earth, known as “Torpag Chershenbesi” or “Ilakhir Charshanba”. It is believed that on this day nature revives again. Azerbaijanis consider this Charshanba as the most important among the four and hold special traditions related to this day. For example, there should be seven varieties of food on the table and all of their names must start with letter 's' in Azerbaijani, such as sumakh (a kind of spice), sud (milk), sirke (vinegar), samani (prepared from wheat), and so on. Folk tales say that in the evening of the fourth Charshanba, it is possible for young girls to see their future husbands by approaching to a mirror with a candle in their hands. Children knock at the doors of neighbouring houses and leave their hats or bags, hoping for candies and desserts that are specially prepared for the holiday such as shakarbura and pakhlava.

Ceremonies 
During Novruz holiday, various songs related to Novruz are sung and different activities such as tightrope walking and wrestling take place in the public squares. Another ceremony is that of growing samani in a plate, which symbolises the fertility of spring. One especially notable portion of the festival is the traditional comedic performance of the story of Kosa and Kecel – permanent characters in the holiday narrative. These personas and their fighting represent the conflict between Winter and Spring. At the end of the ceremony, Kecel wins the duel, indicating the victory of Spring over Winter. The Novruz holiday lasts around a week in Azerbaijan.

Beliefs related to Novruz 

 Entire families gather at home and sit around a table (symbolizing that they have spent a year together),
 On the last night of the year, family members sprinkle water on each other (it means they will get rid of all difficulties of the old year).
 It is mandatory on this day to serve seven dishes that begin with the letter "s" in Azerbaijani language.
 During holidays, the doors are not locked and it symbolizes the hospitality of the host.
 On the first day of Novruz, the houses must be lit during the whole night. Putting the light off is related to bad luck.
 Jumping seven times over fire (it is believed that the fire will burn the hardness of the last year).
 There must be a mirror and burning candles on the table (mirror is the symbol of happiness and the light of candle keeps the evil spirits away from the house).
 According to belief in Azerbaijan, the weather of the first day of Novruz indicates spring, the second day after it is summer, the third day is autumn and the fourth is winter.

Gallery

References 

Azerbaijan
Society of Azerbaijan
Nowruz
Public holidays in Azerbaijan
Spring (season) events in Azerbaijan